The medial calcaneal branches of the tibial nerve (internal calcaneal branches) perforate the laciniate ligament, and supply the skin of the heel and medial side of the sole of the foot.

Structure 
The medial calcaneal nerve originates either from the tibial nerve or the lateral plantar nerve. It splits into two cutaneous branches.

Function 
The medial calcaneal nerve provides sensory innervation to the medial side of the heel.

See also
 Cutaneous innervation of the lower limbs

References 

Nerves of the lower limb and lower torso